Kazimierz Aleksander Sabbat (27 February 1913 – 19 July 1989), was President of Poland-in-exile from 8 April 1986 until his death, 19 July 1989, after serving (from 1976) as Prime Minister of the Polish government-in-exile.

Early life
Sabbat was born on 27 February 1913 in Bieliny Kapitulne, at the foot of the Lysa Gora mountain. Sabbat completed secondary school in Mielec, and studied law at the Warsaw University shortly before World War II. He was a Scout, and remained dedicated to the concept of Scouting, even in his later life while in exile.

World War II
After a short service in the Navy, Sabbat was directed to the Motorized Brigade of Stanisław Maczek. Wounded during the Polish retreat in 1939, he managed to reach Great Britain where he was directed to the British General Staff as an officer responsible for youth.

Post war
After being discharged from the army in 1948, he started up his own successful business in England. He later worked for the Scouting Organization and the Association of Polish Veterans on a voluntary basis.

As an executive of the National Union he managed the Treasury Division, and in 1976 became the Prime Minister of the Polish government-in-exile. He attempted to unite the various émigré circles and created ever stronger links with the opposition movement in Poland, which benefited from the Government in exile's moral and material help through different Funds.

He became President of the Republic of Poland (in Exile) in 1986 succeeding Edward Raczyński. He died in London, aged 76, in 1989. Coincidentally, on the same day Wojciech Jaruzelski was elected by a still unfree Parliament as the first President of the country since the 1950s. Ryszard Kaczorowski, Minister of Domestic Affairs and designated successor, took office in exile and on 22 December 1990, after the first free and fair elections in Poland since the war, handed his powers and the insignia of the Polish Second Republic to President-elect Lech Wałęsa.

Sabbat is buried on Gunnersbury Cemetery in London, along with Anna Sabbat, who died on 28 April 2015. Their children all still live in areas near to London. He has eight grandchildren.

External links
 Kazimierz Sabbat webpage at the  President of the Republic of Poland website
 About Sabbat scouting activity

References

(Note: This site is derivative of the above link)

1913 births
1989 deaths
People from Kielce County
20th-century Polish people
Polish Scouts and Guides
University of Warsaw alumni
Presidents of Poland
Prime Ministers of Poland
Polish emigrants to the United Kingdom
Polish anti-communists